Hook-up has several meanings: 
 Making a connection between components in a system
 An electrical connector
 A connection to water, sewer, or electrical utilities at a campsite
 Meet up, or making a connection between people
 Slang term for courtship, especially of short duration
 A one-night stand
 Casual relationship or casual sex
 In urban slang, a discount
 In urban slang, a drug dealer

Arts and entertainment
 Hooking Up, a collection of essays and short stories by American author Tom Wolfe
 "Hook Up", song by Dawn Raid All-Stars 2004
 Hooking Up (film), a 2020 American comedy-drama film starring Brittany Snow and Sam Richardson

Other
 Hook-Ups, an American skateboard brand